Lust for a Vampire, also known as Love for a Vampire or To Love a Vampire (the latter title was the one used on American television), is a 1971 British Hammer Horror film directed by Jimmy Sangster, starring Ralph Bates, Barbara Jefford, Suzanna Leigh, Michael Johnson, and Yutte Stensgaard. It was given an R rating in the United States for some violence, gore, strong adult content and nudity. It is the second film in the Karnstein Trilogy, loosely based on the 1872 Sheridan Le Fanu novella Carmilla. It was preceded by The Vampire Lovers (1970) and followed by Twins of Evil (1971). The three films do not form a chronological development, but use the Karnstein family as the source of the vampiric threat and were somewhat daring for the time in explicitly depicting lesbian themes.

Production of Lust for a Vampire began not long after the release of The Vampire Lovers.

The film has a cult following, although some Hammer Horror fans have accused it of being overly camp. Its most noted scene shows Yutte Stensgaard drenched in blood and partially covered by blood-soaked rags, although the filmed scene is not as explicit as that shown in a promotional still.

Other notable actors in the film are Harvey Hall (who has a different role in each film of this series), David Healy and popular radio DJ Mike Raven as Count Karnstein. Karnstein's voice, however, is dubbed by an uncredited Valentine Dyall.

Plot
The film is set in 1830, 40 years after the events of The Vampire Lovers. In the deserted chapel at Castle Karnstein, Count and Countess Karnstein conduct a Satanic ceremony to resurrect the body of their daughter Carmilla. Richard LeStrange has come to the village to get background for his books about witches, vampires and black magic. Warned to beware of Castle Karnstein, he takes no heed. Immediately upon entering the castle, he is set upon by three women dressed in shrouds. They turn out to be students on an educational tour from Miss Simpson's fashionable finishing school. As LeStrange is being introduced to Miss Simpson and her students, a new student arrives, one Mircalla Herritzen. LeStrange falls in love immediately.

Later that evening, when LeStrange relates his adventure to the men at the village inn, one of the serving girls is found dead with two holes in her neck, and LeStrange is convinced that the Karnstein story is not mere superstition. When he chances to meet the recently-hired teacher of English literature on his way to Miss Simpson's school, he tricks him into going to Vienna and arranges to take his position at the school. Shortly thereafter, Mircalla's roommate Susan Pelley disappears. When the headmaster Giles Barton discovers the secret of Mircalla/Carmilla, he offers himself to her. Later that day, after Barton's body is found, LeStrange goes through his books and discovers what Barton had learned; that Mircalla Herritzen is Carmilla Karnstein. LeStrange confesses his love for her, and they make love whilst the song Strange Love plays.

Miss Simpson, worried about the disappearance of a student and the death of her headmaster, decides not to call in the authorities or to notify Susan Pelley's father, particularly when Countess Herritzen's private physician agrees to certify Barton's death as a heart attack. However, dance teacher Jenny Playfair notifies both the police and Mr Pelley, all of whom arrive to investigate. The Karnsteins manage to kill the policeman who has just discovered Susan's body in the bottom of a well, but Mr Pelley arrives with a writ of exhumation and a pathologist to investigate his daughter's death. Susan's body is exhumed (it has just been conveniently buried by the Karnsteins), and talk gets around that she was the victim of a vampire. Together with the local priest, the villagers storm Castle Karnstein with the intent of burning it to the ground. LeStrange also makes his way to the castle, planning to save Mircalla. The villagers trap all three Karnsteins in the burning castle, where a timber falls from the ceiling and impales Mircalla/Carmilla. LeStrange is saved from the fire, with Count and Countess Karnstein remaining, safe in the knowledge that fire does not destroy them.

Cast
 Michael Johnson as Richard LeStrange
 Yutte Stensgaard as Mircalla Herritzen/Carmilla Karnstein
 Ralph Bates as Giles Barton
 Barbara Jefford as Countess Herritzen
 Suzanna Leigh as Janet Playfair
 Helen Christie as Miss Simpson
 Mike Raven as Count Karnstein
 Harvey Hall as Inspector Heinrich
 Michael Brennan as landlord
 Pippa Steel as Susan Pelley
 Judy Matheson as Amanda
 David Healy as Raymond Pelley
 Jonathan Cecil as	Biggs
 Erik Chitty as Professor Herz
 Jack Melford as bishop
 Christopher Neame as Hans
 Kirsten Lindholm as peasant girl
 Luan Peters as Trudi
 Christopher Cunningham as coachman
 Nick Brimble as 1st villager
 Sue Longhurst as schoolgirl

Production 
Tudor Gates was hired to write the original script called To Love a Vampire, following the success of The Vampire Lovers. He says it was based on an original script he wrote for Mario Bava. Terence Fisher was to direct but he was badly injured in a car accident. At one stage Harry Fine was going to direct but then Jimmy Sangster took over. Gates said Sangster clashed with the producers during filming over creative decisions - such as the producers insisting on a pop song being put in the film to copy the pop song from Butch Cassidy and the Sundance Kid.

Partially due to censorship restraints from the British Board of Film Classification, this film and the next one, Twins of Evil, had increasingly less overt lesbian elements in the story than did The Vampire Lovers. Carmilla, for example, in this film falls in love with a man. Ingrid Pitt was offered the lead, but turned it down. Peter Cushing was supposed to have appeared in the film, but bowed out to care for his sick wife. Cushing was replaced by Bates, who described Lust for a Vampire as "one of the worst films ever made". Bates had earlier appeared in Taste the Blood of Dracula with Madeline Smith, who starred in The Vampire Lovers. 

The song "Strange Love" was recorded for the film by Tracy, a teen singer from Wembley, and released as a 7-inch single, produced by Bob Barratt.

Critical reception 

The Hammer Story: The Authorised History of Hammer Films pans Lust for a Vampire, calling it a "cynical and depressing exercise", and suggesting that "one can only imagine what Fisher, Cushing and Bray's craftsmen might have made of Gates' reasonably literate draft." In contrast, Bruce G. Hallenbeck asserts that "there is much to recommend" the movie, noting that a Gothic atmosphere is "ably evoked", and adding, "I think it was a very good script". Hallenbeck quotes Tudor Gates, the writer of all three films in the Karnstein Trilogy, as saying, "I think, in a way, it was the better of the first two".

See also
Vampire films

References

Sources

External links
 
 Online review of DVD
 Promotional Photographs

1971 horror films
1971 films
British LGBT-related films
Films shot at EMI-Elstree Studios
British erotic films
Films set in 1830
Films set in Austria
Films based on horror novels
Films based on works by Sheridan Le Fanu
Hammer Film Productions horror films
1971 LGBT-related films
British vampire films
Gothic horror films
LGBT-related horror films
Films based on Irish novels
Films set in castles
Lesbian-related films
1970s historical horror films
British historical horror films
Films directed by Jimmy Sangster
1970s English-language films
1970s British films